Princess Kanchanakara (8 June 1863 - 20 September 1932) was a Princess of Siam (later Thailand She was a member of Siamese royal family was a daughter of King Mongkut Rama IV of Siam and Chao Chom Manda Sangwal.

Her mother was Chao Chom Manda Sangwal (is a daughter of Thongkham Na Ratchasima and Noi Na Ratchasima (Panikabutra), She given full name Phra Chao Borom Wong Ther Phra Ong Chao Kanchanakara.

Princess Kanchanakara died on 20 September 1932 at the age 69.

References 

1863 births
1932 deaths
19th-century Chakri dynasty
20th-century Chakri dynasty
19th-century Thai people
20th-century Thai people
Thai female Phra Ong Chao
People from Bangkok
Dames Grand Commander of the Order of Chula Chom Klao
Children of Mongkut
Daughters of kings